Polk Terrace is a neighborhood located in the Oak Cliff section of Dallas, Texas. It starts from Camp Wisdom Rd and ends at Redbird Rd in width and starts at I-35 service Rd to Polk St in length.

Neighborhoods in Oak Cliff, Dallas